Fiskeløysvatnet is the name of several lakes in Norway including:

Fiskeløysvatnet (Bjerkreim), a lake in Bjerkreim, Rogaland county
Fiskeløysvatnet (Fyresdal), a lake in Fyresdal, Telemark county
Fiskeløysvatnet (Narvik), a lake in Narvik, Nordland county
Fiskeløysvatnet (Saltdal), a lake in Saltdal, Nordland county
Fiskeløysvatnet (Sør-Varanger), a lake in Sør-Varanger, Finnmark county
Fiskeløysvatnet (Valle), a lake in Valle, Aust-Agder county
Fiskelausvatnet (Grane)